Warren Jones may refer to:

Warren Jones (Canadian football) (born 1966), American quarterback
Warren Jones (footballer) (born 1953), former Australian rules footballer
Warren Jones (Idaho judge) (1943-2018), American judge
Warren Leroy Jones (1895–1993), United States federal judge
Rhubarb Jones (born Warren Jones, 1951–2017), American DJ at WYAY "Eagle 106.7" in Atlanta, Georgia